Events from the year 1615 in Denmark.

Incumbents 
 Monarch – Christian IV

Events 
 31 December – King Christian IV marries Kirsten Munk.

Births 
 10 March – Hans Ulrik Gyldenløve, naval officer and illegitimate son of Christian IV (died 1645)
 23 October – Ove Juul, vice Governor-general of Norway (died 1686)
 31 October – Cornelius Pedersen Lerche, nobleman (died 1681)

Deaths

References

External links

 
1610s in Denmark
Denmark
Years of the 17th century in Denmark